Alan Smithee (also Allen Smithee) is an official pseudonym used by film directors who wish to disown a project. Coined in 1968 and used until it was formally discontinued in 2000, it was the sole pseudonym used by members of the Directors Guild of America (DGA) when directors, dissatisfied with the final product, proved to the satisfaction of a guild panel that they had not been able to exercise creative control over a film. The director was also required by guild rules not to discuss the circumstances leading to the movie or even to acknowledge being the project's director.

History 
Before 1968, DGA rules did not permit directors to be credited under a pseudonym. This was intended to prevent producers from forcing them upon directors, which would inhibit the development of their résumés. The guild also required that the director be credited, in support of the auteur theory, which posits that the director is the primary creative force behind a film.

The Smithee pseudonym was created for use on the film Death of a Gunfighter, released in 1969. During its filming, lead actor Richard Widmark was unhappy with director Robert Totten and arranged to have him replaced by Don Siegel. Siegel later estimated that he had spent 9 to 10 days filming, while Totten had spent 25 days. Each had roughly an equal amount of footage in Siegel's final edit, but Siegel made clear that Widmark had effectively been in charge the entire time. When the film was finished, Siegel did not want to take the credit for it and Totten refused to take credit in his place. The DGA panel hearing the dispute agreed that the film did not represent either director's creative vision.

The original proposal was to credit the fictional "Al Smith", but the name was deemed too common and was already in use within the film industry. The last name was first changed to "Smithe", then "Smithee", which was thought to be distinctive enough to avoid confusion with similar names but without drawing attention to itself. Critics praised the film and its "new" director, with The New York Times commenting that the film was "sharply directed by Allen Smithee who has an adroit facility for scanning faces and extracting sharp background detail," and Roger Ebert commenting, "Director Allen Smithee, a name I'm not familiar with, allows his story to unfold naturally."

Following its coinage, the pseudonym "Alan Smithee" was applied retroactively to Fade In (also known as Iron Cowboy), a film starring Burt Reynolds and directed by Jud Taylor, which was first released before the release of Death of a Gunfighter. Taylor also requested the pseudonym for City in Fear (1980) with David Janssen. Taylor commented on its use when he received the DGA's Robert B. Aldrich Achievement Award in 2003:

The spelling "Alan Smithee" became standard, and the Internet Movie Database lists about two dozen feature films and many more television features and series episodes credited to this name. A persistent urban legend suggests that this particular spelling was chosen because it is an anagram of the phrase "the alias men", but this is apocryphal.

Over the years the name and its purpose became more widely known. Some directors violated the embargo on discussing their use of the pseudonym. In 1997, the film An Alan Smithee Film: Burn Hollywood Burn was released, in which a man named Alan Smithee (Eric Idle) wishes to disavow a film he directed, but is unable to do so because the only pseudonym he is permitted to use is his own name. The film was directed by Arthur Hiller, who reported to the DGA that producer Joe Eszterhas had interfered with his creative control, and successfully removed his own name from the film, so Alan Smithee was credited instead. The film was a commercial and critical failure, released in only 19 theaters, grossing only $45,779 in the United States with a budget of about $10 million, and Rotten Tomatoes reports an aggregate critical rating of only 8% positive. The film also was nominated for eight Golden Raspberry Awards at the following year's ceremony, and won five, including Worst Picture. The harsh negative publicity that surrounded the film drew unwanted mainstream attention to the pseudonym. Following this, the DGA retired the name; for the film Supernova (2000), dissatisfied director Walter Hill was instead credited as "Thomas Lee", and Accidental Love director, David O. Russell, left the product credited to Stephen Greene.

Meanwhile, the name had been used outside of the film industry, and it continues to be used in other media and on film projects not under the purview of the DGA. Although the pseudonym was intended for use by directors, the Internet Movie Database lists several uses as writer credits as well. Variations of the name have also occasionally been used, such as "Alan and Alana Smithy" (screenwriters for the 2011 film Hidden 3D).

Uses 
Historical uses of the "Alan Smithee" credit (or equivalent), in chronological order:

Film direction 

The following films credit "Smithee"; the actual director is listed when known.
In a few cases, the alias is used for a creative contributor other than the director, shown in boldface.
 Fade In a.k.a. Iron Cowboy (1968), directed by Jud Taylor. Shown in previews with Taylor credited, then shelved; issued in 1975 with Smithee credited as director.
 Death of a Gunfighter (1969), directed separately by Robert Totten and Don Siegel
 The Barking Dog (1978), director unknown
 Gypsy Angels (1980), director unknown
 City in Fear (1980), directed by Jud Taylor
 Fun and Games (1980), directed by Paul Bogart
 Student Bodies (1981), directed by Mickey Rose, produced by Michael Ritchie under the pseudonym
 Twilight Zone: The Movie (1983), Second Assistant Director Anderson House used the pseudonym for the first segment, in which actor Vic Morrow and two children were killed in a helicopter accident during production. This represents a rare instance where the "Alan Smithee" credit was taken by an assistant director. 
 Appointment with Fear (1985), directed by Ramzi Thomas
 Stitches (1985), directed by Rod Holcomb
 Let's Get Harry (1986), directed by Stuart Rosenberg
 Morgan Stewart's Coming Home (1987), directed by Paul Aaron and Terry Windsor
 Ghost Fever (1987), directed by Lee Madden
 I Love N.Y. (1987) written and directed by Gianni Bozzacchi
 Catchfire (1990) as originally released in theaters, directed by Dennis Hopper. A subsequent video release under the title Backtrack was Hopper's intended "director's cut", for which he received credit.
 The Shrimp on the Barbie (1990), directed by Michael Gottlieb
 Solar Crisis (1990), directed by Richard C. Sarafian
 Bloodsucking Pharaohs in Pittsburgh (1991), directed by Dean Tschetter
 Maniac Cop III: Badge of Silence (1993), directed by William Lustig
 The Birds II: Land's End (1994), directed by Rick Rosenthal
 The Journey Inside (1994), directed by Barnaby Jackson
 National Lampoon's Senior Trip (1995), directed by Kelly Makin with a segment credited to Smithee
 Raging Angels (1995), director unknown
 Smoke n Lightnin (1995), director unknown
 Hellraiser: Bloodline (1996), directed by Kevin Yagher
 Exit (1996), directed by Ric Roman Waugh
 Mighty Ducks, The Animated Series: The First Face-Off (1997), co-directed by Steve Langley
 Dilemma (1997), directed by Eric Larsen and Eric Louzil
 Le Zombi de Cap-Rouge (1997), directed by Simon Robideaux
 Sub Down (1997), directed by Gregg Champion
 An Alan Smithee Film: Burn Hollywood Burn (1997), directed by Arthur Hiller
 Picture of Priority (1998), director unknown
 Wadd: The Life & Times of John C. Holmes (1998), directed by Cass Paley
 The Coroner (1999), directed by Brian Katkin and Juan A. Mas
 River Made to Drown In (1999), directed by James Merendino
 Woman Wanted (1999), directed by Kiefer Sutherland
 The Disciples (2000), directed by Kirk Wong
 In the Wrong Hands (2002), directed by Chris Johnston and James A. Seale
 Fugitives Run (2003), directed by Philip Spink
 Eep! (Dutch: Iep!) (2010), directed by Rita Horst as Ellen Smith, the only time a Dutch director asked for this credit. Ellen is a Dutch name that is pronounced similarly to Alan.
 Old 37 (2015), directed by Christian Winters

The following films were credited to their actual directors during their original theatrical presentations. When re-edited for TV, or for other reasons, the Smithee credit was used:
 Dune (1984), only for the version as extended and edited for broadcast television; directed by David Lynch. In addition to the "Smithee" directing credit, for the broadcast TV version Lynch's screenwriting credit goes to "Judas Booth" (a reference to Judas Iscariot and John Wilkes Booth)
 Gunhed (1989) as released in the United States, directed by Masato Harada
 The Guardian (1990) only for the version as edited for cable television, directed by William Friedkin, credited to "Alan Von Smithee"
 The Nutt House (1992), written by Scott Spiegel (as Peter Perkinson), Bruce Campbell (as R.O.C. Sandstorm), Ivan Raimi (as Alan Smithee Sr.), and Sam Raimi (as Alan Smithee Jr.)
 Scent of a Woman (airline version) (1992) directed by Martin Brest (as Alan Smithee)
 Rudy (1993) as edited for television, directed by David Anspaugh
 Heat (1995) as edited for television, directed by Michael Mann
 Meet Joe Black (1998), as edited for in-flight viewing and cable television, by Martin Brest
 The Insider (1999) as edited for television, directed by Michael Mann

Television direction 

 The Challenge (1970) initiated by Joseph Sargent, finished by George McCowen (credited on screen as Allen Smithee)
 Kate Loves a Mystery, "Love, on Instant Replay", directed by E. Arthur Kean.
 The Twilight Zone (1985), "Paladin of the Lost Hour" (1985), directed by Gilbert Cates.
 Tiny Toon Adventures had episode segments that were credited to "Alan Smithee"; 1990 segments "Pit Bullied" and "Duck in the Muck" were actually directed by Art Leonardi.
 A Nero Wolfe Mystery, "Motherhunt" (May 12 and 19, 2002), the fifth episode of the second season, with Charles B. Wessler believed to be debuting as director.
 Call of the Wild m, 1993 CBS-TV movie directed by Michael Toshiyuki Uno, starring Rick Schroder.
 Dalton: Code of Vengeance II, the second television movie (May 11, 1986) in the Code of Vengeance series, actually a mashup of two episodes of a failed series
 The Cosby Show, "You Can't Stop the Music", episode 22 of season 8 (1992), director unknown
 It's Academic (June 19, 2006); this episode had numerous credits attributed to Smithee.
 Karen's Song, first episode.
 Red Shoe Diaries, "Accidents Happen", episode 9 of season 1 (1993), directed by Mary Lambert.
 La Femme Nikita, "Catch a Falling Star", episode 16 of season 4 of American television series, believed to be directed by Joseph L. Scanlan.
 Riviera, 1987 ABC-TV movie intended as pilot, directed by John Frankenheimer.
 MacGyver, "Pilot", directed by Jerrold Freedman, and "The Heist", director unknown (1985).
 Moonlight, TV movie and pilot for an unsold series (1982) (not to be confused with the later CBS vampire series), directed by Jackie Cooper and Rod Holcomb.
 The Owl, 1991 television film credited to director Tom Holland when originally broadcast. Holland approved of the 46-minute television cut but disliked the extended 84-minute home video cut and credited it to "Alan Smithee".
 Last Exile, episode 21, animation director unknown.
 Eiken, second episode, director unknown
 Gunslinger Stratos: The Animation, first episode, assistant animation director unknown.
 Joker Game, second episode, director unknown.
 KonoSuba, episodes 4 and 9 (season 1), storyboard artist unknown.
 McClain's Law, "Requiem for a Narc", director unknown.
 Frankie Drake Mysteries, episode 8 "The Pilot", director Leslie Hope as Alanis Smithee.
 Tamayomi, episodes 6 and 11, director unknown.

Music video direction 

 "I Will Always Love You" — Whitney Houston (1992) from the soundtrack for The Bodyguard, directed by Nick Brandt
 "Heaven n' Hell" — Salt-N-Pepa (1994)
 "Digging the Grave" — Faith No More (1995), directed by Marcus Raboy
 "Let's Get Down" — Tony! Toni! Toné! featuring DJ Quik, directed by Joseph Kahn (often credited as "J. Whiskey")
 "Building a Mystery" — Sarah McLachlan (1997), directed by Matt Mahurin
 "I Don't Want to Wait" — Paula Cole (1997), directed by Mark Seliger and Fred Woodward
 "So Help Me Girl" — Gary Barlow (1997)
 "Victory" — Puff Daddy (Sean Combs) featuring The Notorious B.I.G. and Busta Rhymes (1998), directed by Marcus Nispel
 "Kiss the Rain" — Billie Myers (1998)
 "The First Night" — Monica (1998), directed by Joseph Kahn
 "Sweet Surrender" — Sarah McLachlan (1998), directed by Floria Sigismondi
 "Reunited" — Wu-Tang Clan (1998)
 "Waiting for Tonight" — Jennifer Lopez (1999), directed by Francis Lawrence
 "The Future Is X-Rated" — Matthew Good Band (1999)
 "Maria" — Blondie (1999) directed by Roman Coppola
 "Late Goodbye" — Poets of the Fall (2004)
 "Some Kind of Monster" — Metallica (2004)
 "Lose My Breath" — Destiny's Child (2005), directed by Marc Klasfeld
 "Death In Midsummer" — Deerhunter (2018)

Other media 

 Daredevil #338–342, a comics series published by Marvel Comics: Writer D. G. Chichester learned during a brief break from the series that he was to be replaced; for the five issues he was obligated to write he demanded an Alan Smithee credit.
 Team X 2000, a one-shot comic published by Marvel Comics, is credited to two writers. One being Sean Ruffner, the other being credited as "A. Smithee," is also believed to be D.G. Chichester.
 Strontium Dog, a 2000AD comic strip: In 1996, writer Peter Hogan was dropped from the series and his episodes rewritten, and demanded that his name be removed from the credits.
 Marine Sharpshooter 4, a first-person shooter game, had Alan Smithee listed as the Art Director.
 Alan Smithee was credited as the director and included in the title of three adult movies in the early 2000s.
 A teaser for the video game Metal Gear Solid 4 shown at E3 2005 credits "Alan Smithee" as the director of the title before being replaced by Hideo Kojima's name.
 In the loose-leaf 1990's run of Who's Who in the DC Universe, the art for Elasti-Girl is partially credited to Alan Smithee.
 Equinox, a video game released by Sony Imagesoft for the Super Nintendo Entertainment System in 1993, credits Alan Smithee as director.
 The series premiere of Anatole, "Anatole's Parisian Adventure", credits Alan Smithee as the writer.
 NHL Hitz 2003, a 2002 video game released by Midway for the PlayStation 2, Xbox and GameCube, credits Alan Smithee as the color commentator.
 2007 Issue of Inside Tennis magazine in place of the usual Art Director spot of the masthead.
 In the making-of documentary about the production and release of 12 Monkeys, director Terry Gilliam draws a doodle illustrating his frustration at unexpectedly poor test screening surveys, then decides the drawing is not up to his usual standards and so signs it 'Alan Smithee', explaining the history of the name as he does so.
 In the game Fire Emblem Heroes, the artist for the Mythic Hero Elimine is credited as "Alan Smithee".

Other pseudonyms 

 In several BBC television drama programmes in the 1970s, writers used the pseudonym "David Agnew", for reasons similar to the Smithee name.
 The 1976 Doctor Who serial "The Brain of Morbius" was credited to writer "Robin Bland". After Terrance Dicks' original script was heavily rewritten by script editor Robert Holmes, Dicks demanded that his name be removed and credit be given to a "bland pseudonym".
 The 1977 TV series Logan's Run was so heavily rewritten, screenwriter David Gerrold was credited as "Noah Ward", sounding like "no award".
 City Heat (1984) as originally released in theaters, fired director Blake Edwards had his screenwriting credit changed to "Sam O. Brown" (a nod to another of his films, S.O.B.)
 Showgirls (1995) as edited for television, directed by Paul Verhoeven (who used the pseudonym "Jan Jensen", instead of "Smithee"). However, the edited, R-rated version of Showgirls that was prepared for release at Blockbuster was supervised and authorized by Verhoeven, and this version carries the director's name.
 Supernova (2000), dissatisfied director Walter Hill was credited as "Thomas Lee".
 Accidental Love (2015) originally filmed in 2008, director David O. Russell left the film in 2010, later disowning it while the directing credit was changed to "Stephen Greene".
 Exposed (2016): during the editing process Lionsgate changed the story's focus. Gee Malik Linton is the director of the film, but is listed under the pseudonym of "Declan Dale".

See also 

 WGA screenwriting credit system
 :Category:Films credited to Alan Smithee
 :Category:Music videos credited to Alan Smithee
 Cordwainer Bird, a literary equivalent employed by author Harlan Ellison
 Damnatio memoriae

References

External links 
 
 Music videos credited to Alan Smithee
 Directed by Allen Smithee, a 2001 book about the director and auteur theory in general. See contributions by Craig J Saper.
 * The Top 10 Films of Alan Smithee - Meditoria.com

Film characters introduced in 1968
Anonymity pseudonyms
Collective pseudonyms
Fictional directors
In-jokes
Placeholder names